Gino Rocca (Mantua, February 22, 1891 - Milan, February 13, 1941) was an Italian writer, playwright, journalist and theater critic.

Author of over ninety comedies, partly in Venetian language, brought to the theater by numerous companies and represented up to the present day. Among the last productions, the one of 1983 with Tonino Micheluzzi and Mario Valdemarin who brought on stage the three one-act plays L'imbriago de sesto, La scorzeta de limon, L'amigo american directed by Toni Andreetta.

Biography 
Born in Mantua from a father from Turin and a mother from Feltre, he spent the first years of his youth between Piedmont and Veneto and attended for some years the Faculty of Law at the University of Padua and Turin.

In 1913, having abandoned his studies, he moved to Milan where, having met Benito Mussolini, he became and remained for over twenty years a theater critic for the newspaper Il Popolo d'Italia.

The advent of the First World War had considerable influence on the young writer as demonstrated in the novel Uragano of 1919, in the 1920 drama in three acts Le Liane and La farsa dei nevrastenici. In 1919 he was among the founders of the literary magazine Novella.

In 1931 he received the Bagutta Prize for the novel Gli ultimi furono i primi.

In 1934 he was appointed director of the first Theatre Festival of the Venice Biennale and for the first and only time he directed Goldoni's comedy La bottega del caffè. It was also the first time that a Goldonian work was performed outdoors: "Che amore di campiello la corte del Teatro di San Luca!"

He moved to Venice where between 1937 and 1938 he directed Il Gazzettino.

It returned then to Milan, where on the weekly Il Milione, of the Mondadori, published fourteen unique acts inspired to facts of chronicle.

He continued to collaborate with various literary and theatrical magazines until his physical condition worsened as a result of a war wound that caused the amputation of his leg.

He died in Milan in 1941, but was buried in Fonzaso, in the province of Belluno.

His son Guido, after a long activity as a journalist, followed in his footsteps in the theater, but died in 1961 of a serious illness.

Works 

In Italian:
L'altro amore, 1910
Trame, 1919
Gigomard 
Tramonto romantico
Vecchie storie
Il martirio di San Gregorio
Il primo amore, 1920
Tragedia senza l'eroe, 1924
L'inganno
Purificazione
L'ora onesta
Dopo di noi
L'amante di suo marito
La calzetta rotta
La pelle
L'intesa
La gelosia
Cessate il foc!
Le lettere dell'altro
Le liane, 1920
Le corna del dilemma
Noi, 1921
La farsa dei nevrastenici
Il vincolo del dolore
Colpi di spillo
L'uccisione di un generale in Cina, 1923
Gli amanti impossibili, 1925
Nido rifatto, 1927
Il gladiatore morente, 1928
Il terzo amante, 1929
Volo a vela, 1939
Le carte son sincere
Il re povero, 1939

In Venetian:
 Se no i xe mati, no li volemo, 1926
 Sior Tita paron, 1928
 Su de noi, 1926
 La vecia insempiada
 L'imbriago de sesto
 Checo
 Mustaci de fero, 1932
 Gli ultimi del Krak
 El sol sui veri, 1911

References

Bibliography 

 Gino Rocca, "Il Dramma", n. 349, 1 marzo 1941, p. 28
 Fernando Ghilardi, Gino Rocca. Il canto iridente e pietoso, "Il Dramma", n. 345-346, giugno-luglio 1965, pp. 91-100

External links 

University of Turin alumni
University of Padua alumni
Italian-language writers
Italian magazine founders
Italian theatre critics
20th-century Italian journalists
20th-century Italian dramatists and playwrights
20th-century Italian writers

1891 births

1941 deaths